Thomas Hudson (born 15 December 1935) is a British modern pentathlete. He competed at the 1956 Summer Olympics.

References

1935 births
Living people
British male modern pentathletes
Olympic modern pentathletes of Great Britain
Modern pentathletes at the 1956 Summer Olympics
TeamBath coaches